Camp David is the  country retreat for the President of the United States. Because it is technically a military installation, the staffing is primarily provided by the Seabees, Civil Engineer Corps (CEC), the United States Navy and the United States Marine Corps. Naval construction battalions are tasked with base construction and send detachments as needed.

Originally known as Hi-Catoctin, Camp David was built as a camp for federal government agents and their families by the Works Progress Administration. Construction started in 1935 and was completed in 1938. In 1942, President Franklin D. Roosevelt converted it to a presidential retreat and renamed it "Shangri-La", for the fictional Himalayan paradise in the 1933 novel Lost Horizon by British author James Hilton.

Camp David received its present name in 1953 from Dwight D. Eisenhower, in honor of his father and his grandson, both named David.

The Catoctin Mountain Park does not indicate the location of Camp David on park maps due to privacy and security concerns, although it can be seen through the use of publicly accessible satellite images.

Presidential use

Franklin D. Roosevelt hosted Sir Winston Churchill at Shangri-La in May 1943, during World War II. Dwight Eisenhower held his first cabinet meeting there on November 22, 1955, following hospitalization and convalescence he required after a heart attack suffered in Denver, Colorado, on September 24. Eisenhower met Nikita Khrushchev there for two days of discussions in September 1959.

John F. Kennedy and his family often enjoyed riding and other recreational activities there, and Kennedy often allowed White House staff and Cabinet members to use the retreat when he or his family were not there. Lyndon B. Johnson met with advisors in this setting and hosted both Australian prime minister Harold Holt and Canadian prime minister Lester B. Pearson there. Richard Nixon was a frequent visitor. He personally directed the construction of a swimming pool and other improvements to Aspen Lodge. Gerald Ford hosted Indonesian president Suharto at Camp David.

Jimmy Carter initially favored closing Camp David in order to save money, but once he visited the retreat, he decided to keep it. Carter brokered the Camp David Accords there in September 1978 between Egyptian president Anwar al-Sadat and Israeli prime minister Menachem Begin. Ronald Reagan visited the retreat more than any other president. In 1984, Reagan hosted British prime minister Margaret Thatcher. Reagan restored the nature trails that Nixon paved over so he could horseback ride at Camp David. George H. W. Bush's daughter, Dorothy Bush Koch, was married there in 1992, in the first wedding held at Camp David. During his tenure as president, Bill Clinton spent every Thanksgiving at Camp David with his family. In July 2000, he hosted the 2000 Camp David Summit negotiations between Israeli prime minister Ehud Barak and Palestinian Authority chairman Yasser Arafat there.

In February 2001, George W. Bush held his first meeting with a European leader, UK prime minister Tony Blair, at Camp David, to discuss missile defense, Iraq, and NATO. After the September 11 attacks, Bush held a Cabinet meeting at Camp David to prepare the United States invasion of Afghanistan. During his two terms in office, Bush visited Camp David 149 times, for a total of 487 days, for hosting foreign visitors as well as a personal retreat. He met Blair there four times. Among the numerous other foreign leaders he hosted at Camp David were Russian president Vladimir Putin and President Musharraf of Pakistan in 2003, Danish prime minister Anders Fogh Rasmussen in June 2006, and British prime minister Gordon Brown in 2007.

Barack Obama chose Camp David to host the 38th G8 summit in 2012. President Obama also hosted Russian prime minister Dmitry Medvedev at Camp David, as well as the GCC Summit there in 2015.

Donald Trump hosted Senate majority leader Mitch McConnell and Speaker of the House Paul Ryan at Camp David while the Republican Party prepared to defend both houses of Congress in the 2018 midterm elections. The 46th G7 summit was to be held at Camp David on June 10–12, 2020, but was cancelled due to health concerns during the ongoing COVID-19 pandemic.

Count of visits by each president

Practice golf facility
To be able to play his favorite sport, President Eisenhower had golf course architect Robert Trent Jones design a practice golf facility at Camp David. Around 1954, Jones built one golf hole—a par 3—with four different tees; Eisenhower added a  driving range near the helicopter landing zone.

Security incidents

The two-seater, which was out of radio communication, was escorted to nearby Hagerstown, Maryland, without incident.

On July 10, 2011, a F-15 intercepted another small plane near Camp David when Obama was again in the residence; a total of three were intercepted that weekend.

Gallery

See also

 List of residences of presidents of the United States
 Camp Misty Mount Historic District and Camp Greentop Historic District, built at the same time in Catoctin Mountain Park as Camps1 and2
 Chequers, the country house of the Prime Minister of the United Kingdom
 Harrington Lake, the retreat of the Prime Minister of Canada
 Night of Camp David, a 1965 novel (political thriller)
 Official residence
 Orange One, a U.S. Navy-operated facility underneath Camp David
 Blair House, another official White House lodging for guests
 Presidential Townhouse, the official guest house for former U.S. presidents
 Rapidan Camp, the predecessor of Camp David from 1929 to 1933
 Site R, bunker and communications center near Camp David
 Trowbridge House, adjacent to Blair House and soon to be renovated to become the new guest house for former presidents
 White House, official residence of the president of the United States since 1800

References

Works cited

External links

 
 Digital documents regarding Camp David  from the Dwight D. Eisenhower Presidential Library

Presidential residences in the United States
Buildings and structures in Frederick County, Maryland
Houses in Frederick County, Maryland
South Mountain Range (Maryland−Pennsylvania)
Continuity of government in the United States
Executive branch of the government of the United States
United States Navy installations
White House Military Office
Presidency of Dwight D. Eisenhower
Works Progress Administration in Maryland
Articles containing video clips
National Park Service Rustic architecture
Rustic architecture in Maryland
Houses completed in 1935